This is a list of Chinese national-type primary schools (SJK(C)) in Kelantan, Malaysia. As of June 2022, there are 15 Chinese primary schools with a total of 5,302 students.

List of Chinese national-type primary schools in Kelantan

See also 
 Lists of Chinese national-type primary schools in Malaysia

Footnotes

References

 
Schools in Kelantan
Kelantan
Chinese-language schools in Malaysia